The Halberstadt tramway network is a network of tramways forming part of the public transport system in Halberstadt, a city in the federal state of Saxony-Anhalt, Germany.

Current Fleet

Main Fleet 
 5 low-floor articulated , numbers 1 to 5
 3 articulated bi-directional GT4, numbers 164 (formerly Freiburg 106), 167 (formerly Nordhausen 91, formerly Freiburg 110), 168 (formerly Nordhausen 92, formerly Freiburg 111)
 1 articulated uni-directional GT4, number 156 (formerly Stuttgart 550)

Historical trams and special cars 
 1 Historical Lindner tram built in 1939, number 31
 1 Historical LOWA ET 1 tram built in 1956, number 36
 1 ET 57 tram with EB 62 trailer, numbers 39 and 61 respectively
 1 ET 62 tram, number 30
 1 articulated bi-directional GT4 "HAKIBA" (Halberstäder Kinderbahn), number 166 (formerly Freiburg 105)
 1 articulated bi-directional GT4 maintenance tram, number 161 (formerly Freiburg 105)

See also
List of town tramway systems in Germany
Trams in Germany

References

External links

 
 

Halberstadt
Halberstadt
Transport in Saxony-Anhalt
Metre gauge railways in Germany
Halberstadt